East Bengal FC was formed in 1920 and has been one of the most successful football teams in India. Since establishment, it has seen numerous legends of Indian football like Ahmed Khan, Tulsidas Balaram, Sudhir Karmakar, Monoranjan Bhattacharya, Krishanu Dey, Bhaichung Bhutia etc. play the famous Red and Gold outfit to numerous prestigious titles and honours through the various generations. This is a list of the East Bengal FC players since the establishment in 1920.

Key

List of East Bengal players

See also
 East Bengal F.C. (women)
 East Bengal Club (cricket)

References

External links 

East Bengal Club related lists